Babatunde Łukasz Aiyegbusi (born May 26, 1989) is a Nigerian-Polish professional wrestler and former American football player. He is currently signed to WWE, where he performs on the NXT brand under the ring name Dabba-Kato. He previously played for a number of teams in the Polish American Football League and German Football League, and had a stint with the Minnesota Vikings during the 2015 preseason.

Early life and football career
Born in Oleśnica, Wrocław Voivodeship (now part of Lower Silesian Voivodeship) of South-West Poland on May 26, 1989 to a Polish mother and an immigrant Nigerian father, Aiyegbusi began playing American football in 2005 as an offensive lineman. He played in the Polish American Football League for the Giants Wrocław (formerly known as The Crew Wrocław) and the Warsaw Eagles and in the German Football League for the Dresden Monarchs. In 2015, Aiyegbusi was signed by the Minnesota Vikings of the National Football League and he participated in their preseason program, playing three preseason games before being released as part of roster cuts prior to the 2015 NFL season.

Professional wrestling career

WWE (2016–present) 
On April 12, 2016, Aiyegbusi joined the WWE Performance Center as part of a new class of recruits. He made his professional wrestling debut under his birth name, portraying a face, at a NXT house show in Orlando, Florida on September 30, 2016, competing in a battle royal. In April 2018, Babatunde started to accompany Lio Rush to the ring at NXT live events until Rush was called up to the main roster as part of 205 Live. Babatunde made his televised debut on April 27 at the Greatest Royal Rumble, entering the match as the 37th entrant and being eliminated by Braun Strowman.

On August 3, 2020, Babatunde would make his return to television and his Raw debut. He would debut as part of a Raw Underground segment under the ring name Dabba-Kato. He would develop a winning streak on Raw Underground defeating several local wrestlers until he was defeated by Strowman on the September 21 episode of Raw. As part of the 2020 Draft in October, Dabba-Kato was drafted to the Raw brand. However following the draft, he would not make a single appearance on the brand.

On Night 2 of WrestleMania 37 on April 11, 2021, he returned to help Apollo Crews win the Intercontinental Championship from Big E. Crews would then re-introduce him as Commander Azeez the following Friday on SmackDown, with no mention made of his previous time as Dabba-Kato on Raw, thus transferring to the SmackDown brand. As part of the 2021 Draft, both Crews and Azeez were drafted to the Raw brand. In June 2022, Crews and Azeez were sent to NXT. At NXT Vengeance Day, Azeez returned using his Dabba-Kato name and attacked Apollo Crews following a two-out-of-three falls match against Carmelo Hayes.

Evolve (2019) 
On May 10, 2019, Babatunde made his debut for Evolve (a WWE affiliated promotion) at Evolve 127, defeating Adrian Alanis. He would go on to feud with The Unwanted, led by Eddie Kingston. This came about at Evolve 130, when Kingston and Joe Gacy interfered in the title match between Babatunde and JD Drake, resulting in a no-contest. After a post-match beatdown, The Unwanted then ran to the back, while Babatunde chased after them. Later that night, Babutunde reappeared and was about to perform a double chokeslam on Kingston and Gacy, until Colby Corino and Sean Maluta came out to make the save, resulting in another beatdown. In the coming months, Babatunde mostly faced members of The Unwanted. At Evolve 131, Babatunde defeated Corino in a squash match, and at Evolve 132, he gained a disqualification win over Gacy. He returned at Evolve 135 facing Austin Theory, which ended in a no-contest, after an attack by The Unwanted, continuing the feud. At Evolve 137, the match between Babatunde and Kingston went to a no-contest, and at Evolve 138, he defeated Maluta and allied himself with The Skulk. At Evolve 139, he defeated Kingston in a relaxed rules match. Babatunde's last interaction with The Unwanted was at Evolve 141, where he teamed with Anthony Gutierrez and Arturo Ruas in a losing effort.

Babtunde's final appearance for the promotion came at Evolve 142, when a singles match between him and Anthony Greene was changed to a tag team match involving him and Josh Briggs and The In Crowd. This ended in a disqualification win for The In Crowd, when Briggs hit Greene with a kendo stick.

Other media 
Aiyegbusi, when signed with the Minnesota Vikings, appeared on the Jimmy Kimmel Live show in a segment called "Can Babatunde Move It" where he attempted to move heavy objects in 2015. One of the objects was the wrecking ball from the Miley Cyrus music video, "Wrecking Ball". 

Aiyegbusi, as Commander Azeez, made his video game debut in The Whole Dam Pack DLC for WWE 2K22.

Aiyegbusi portrayed the villainous Samson in the 2020 film The Main Event.

References

External links 
 
 

1988 births
Living people
Minnesota Vikings players
People from Oleśnica
Polish professional wrestlers
American football offensive linemen
Polish players of American football
German Football League players
Polish people of Nigerian descent
Polish expatriates in the United States
People of Yoruba descent
Yoruba sportspeople
21st-century professional wrestlers